Solomon Kuponu  is an Anglican bishop in Nigeria: who is the current bishop of Ijebu-North, following Ezekiel Ayo Awosoga.

Kuponu was born in Badagry, was ordained in Lagos in September 1983, and consecrated bishop on September 11, 2005.

Notes

Living people
Anglican bishops of Ijebu-North
21st-century Anglican bishops in Nigeria
People from Lagos State
Year of birth missing (living people)